Engøy is an island in Stavanger municipality in Rogaland county, Norway.  It is located in the "neighborhood" of Buøy in the borough Hundvåg in the city of Stavanger, just north of the city centre.  The island is almost completely urbanized with many houses on the east side and a lot of industry on the west side.  There were 461 residents on the island in 2014.

The  island is connected to mainland of Stavanger via the Engøy Bridge, which connects Engøy to the islands Sølyst and Grasholmen, and by the Stavanger City Bridge which connects Sølyst and Grasholmen to the mainland.

Engøy was historically part of Hetland municipality until 1 January 1879 when it was transferred to the city of Stavanger.

See also
List of islands of Norway

References

Islands of Stavanger